The 2010 Giro dell'Emilia was the 93rd edition of this single day road bicycle racing. The number 1 jersey was worn by Robert Gesink who won the previous edition.

Teams

Twenty four teams were invited to the 2010 Giro dell'Emilia.

Teams from the UCI Pro Tour

UCI Professional Continental and Continental teams invited here

Results

giro Dell'Emilia
Giro dell
Giro dell'Emilia